Prethopalpus maini is a subterranean goblin spider in the family Oonopidae.

Distribution
This species is endemic to Western Australia. It occurs in caves and vuggy geology in the Pilbara.

Description
The male and female 1.28 mm 1.16 mm.

Etymology
This species is named in honour of Dean C. Main.

References

Oonopidae
Spiders of Australia
Spiders described in 2012